Elvedin Škrijelj (born 19 February 1990) is a Serbian footballer who plays as a defender, most recently for Chennai City in the I-League.

References

External links 
 Elvedin Škrijelj stats at Utakmica.rs 
 
 
 

Living people
1990 births
Bosniaks of Serbia
Serbian footballers
Sportspeople from Novi Pazar
Association football defenders
FK Novi Pazar players
FK BASK players
FK Mladost Lučani players
FK Ibar Rožaje players
FK Tutin players
Serbian First League players
Serbian SuperLiga players
Serbian expatriate footballers
Serbian expatriate sportspeople in Sweden
Expatriate footballers in Sweden